The naga morsarang, also known as sahan, is a container which is used to store medicine in the culture of Toba Batak people of North Sumatra, Indonesia. The naga morsarang is created out of the horn of the water buffalo.

Description
Naga morsarang is one of several types of container in which the datu (Batak people's ritual specialist) kept a supernaturally powerful potion. The naga morsarang is made of horn of a water buffalo. As a container of a powerful potion, the naga morsarang is extensively decorated with complex patterns. The outer surface is incised thoroughly with complex designs. The pointed end of the horn is carved into the shape of a seated figure of a man, or sometimes more. The opening of the horn is plugged with a wooden stopper. This wooden stopper is always shaped into a figure of the singa, a Naga-like underground figures. Many additional figures are sometimes carved as mounting the singa e.g. the lizard Boraspati ni Tano, a human figure, or several human figures. These human figures may represent the datu, owner of the naga morsarang, and the former datus, former owners of the naga morsarang. Others think that these figures represent characters from Batak mythology.

A figure of a lizard, which represents the earth deity Boraspati ni Tano, is sometimes carved inside the hollow of the horn.

Potions

Toba people believed that the spirits of the dead were able to influence the fate of the living. To gain favor from the spirits, the Toba performed elaborate rituals or sacrifices with the help of the datu, a male ritual specialist  who acted as intermediaries between the human and supernatural world. The datu created magic books known as the pustaha which was used by him and by his disciples as a reference for his magic rituals. Among the contents of the pustaha are methods to create different kind of potions used for both white magic and black magic in a kind of complex magic ritual. Naga morsarang are used as container for these potions. 

One example of a white magic potion is the pagar, a potion used as a kind of amulet to protect from evil. The creation of pagar is very difficult, and can only be done on certain auspicious days. Most of the ingredients of a pagar are derived from plants, although sometimes chicken head, its entrails, and its feathers are included in the mixture. The ingredients for a pagar can only be gathered on certain sacred sites known as the sombaon. Creation of a pagar took days or weeks. All the ingredients are then cooked and finely crushed into a kind of paste which is then stored in the naga morsarang.

Similar vessel
The Karo version of the vessel known as perminaken/parminaken or guri-guri. Instead of strictly a bull's horn, the perminaken may use other types of material for the vessel e.g. a bamboo, a gourd, or even a Ming period jar imported from China. The perminaken similarly use a wooden stopper with carvings of a figure of the singa, a person, or a person riding the singa.

See also

Tunggal panaluan

References

Cited works

 NAGA MORSARANG 440mm CONTAINER, Borneoartifact

Sumatra
Religion in Indonesia
Batak
Medicine storage containers